NPR (officially National Public Radio) is a media organization that serves as a national syndicator to most public radio stations in the US.

NPR may also refer to:

Arts, entertainment and media
 National Philharmonic of Russia, a Russian orchestra
 Natural Product Reports, a British peer-reviewed scientific journal published by the Royal Society of Chemistry
 Natural Product Radiance, an Indian scientific journal
 Nevada Public Radio, a public corporation operating several radio stations in Nevada

Government
 National Partnership for Reinventing Government (originally the National Performance Review), an interagency task force, an effort to reform the way the US federal government works
 Nuclear Posture Review, the periodic assessment carried out by the US Department of Defense
 National Population Register, a database of residents in India with Unique Identification Authority of India numbers
 National Police Reserve, a lightly armed national police force during the Allied occupation of Japan and a predecessor to the Japan Ground Self-Defense Force (JGSDF)

Rail transportation
 Nippori Station, JR East station code
 North Pennsylvania Railroad, a former railroad company that served areas around Philadelphia
 Northern Pacific Railway
 Northern Plains Railroad, a short-line railroad that operates in Minnesota and North Dakota
 Northern Powerhouse Rail, a proposed railway in northern England

Technology
 Non-photorealistic rendering, a computer-graphics-rendering technique that does not aim toward photorealism
 nPr, a function for computing permutations in some calculators

Other uses
 Nepalese rupee, by ISO 4217 currency code
Isuzu Elf, known as the Isuzu NPR in North America

See also
 National Petroleum Reserve–Alaska (NPRA), an area of land on the Alaska North Slope owned by the US federal government
 Notice of proposed rulemaking (NPRM), a public notice issued by a federal agency when it wishes to add, remove, or modify a regulation